ZTP may refer to:
ZTP, a ribonucleotide derivative sensed by the Pfl RNA motif
Zero-touch provisioning, a type of provisioning within telecommunications where devices do not require manual intervention on setup
Zero-truncated Poisson distribution
ŽTP, Yugoslav Railways' Belgrade, Novi Sad, Skoplje and Titograd sections, serviced by ŽS series 412 trains